The Kings County Courthouse was erected after Kings County, California was formed; it opened in 1896. Constructed in an eclectic mix of styles in a park in the center of Hanford, it was expanded in 1914. The building served as the county's courthouse until 1976 when it was replaced by the new Kings County Government Center on West Lacey Boulevard.

The building was listed on the National Register of Historic Places in 1978.  The old courthouse was remodeled in the early 1980s and now houses offices, small shops and restaurants.

References

County courthouses in California
Buildings and structures in Kings County, California
Hanford, California
Courthouses on the National Register of Historic Places in California
National Register of Historic Places in Kings County, California
Neoclassical architecture in California